Joseph-Pierre Braemt (15 June 1796 – 2 December 1864) was a Belgian medalist and coin designer.

Biography 

After training at the academies of Ghent and then Brussels, Joseph-Pierre Braemt perfected his craft in Paris with the engraver André Galle and Baron François Joseph Bosio, a renowned sculptor of the time.

He was appointed general engraver of the Hôtel des Monnaies in Brussels and produced the first Belgian coins.

He was a founding member of the Royal Academy of Science, Letters and Fine Arts of Belgium.

Works 

His work includes the following:

1826 : medal commemorating the completion of the digging of a canal between the Haine and the Escaut, under the government of the Kingdom of the Netherlands,
1830 : medal of recognition to the Garde civique, under the Provisional Government of Belgium,
Starting in 1832 :
silver franc coins with the portrait of King Leopold I (5 silver francs, 2 1/2 silver francs, 2 silver francs, 1 silver franc, 1/2 silver franc, 1/4 silver franc, 20 centimes silver),
copper pennies with the Belgian lion and the national motto, in French, "l'union fait la force" (10 cents, 5 cents, 2 cents and 1 penny).

Legacy 

A street in the municipality of Saint-Josse-ten-Noode, where he owned a large property called "Campagne de M. Braemt" (Mr Braem's countryside), on which the street was partly drawn, bears his name.

Bibliography 
 De Seyn, Dictionnaire biographique…., vol. I, sub verbo.
 L. Forrer, Biographical Dictionary of Medallists : Braemt, Joseph Pierre, t. I, London, Spink & Son Ltd, 1904, 691 p., p. 260–261.

References 

19th-century medallists
Académie Royale des Beaux-Arts alumni
Royal Academy of Fine Arts (Ghent) alumni
Coin designers
1796 births
1864 deaths